Companion Piece is an original novella written by Robert Perry and Mike Tucker and based on the long-running British science fiction television series Doctor Who.  It features the Seventh Doctor and Catherine. It was released both as a standard edition hardback and a deluxe edition featuring a frontispiece by Allan Bednar. Both editions have a foreword by Colin Midlane.

2003 British novels
2003 science fiction novels
Doctor Who novellas
Novels by Mike Tucker
Novels by Robert Perry
Telos Publishing books